Ligand Pharmaceuticals is a biopharmaceutical company located in San Diego, California. Founded in 1987 as Progenix Inc., the company went public in 1992. Initially focused on developing its own drugs, a period of turbulence in the early 2000s culminated in its CEO being ejected by the shareholders and provoked a change in focus to the acquisition of existing drugs and forming partnerships to develop them further.

The company has been the subject of multiple regulatory investigations, negative shorts-seller reports and class action lawsuits amid allegations of securities fraud.

In 2018 its CEO was listed among the top five highest paid CEOs in San Diego.

Business 
Ligand Pharmaceutical develops or acquires royalty-generating assets comprising numerous technologies, therapies and drugs. The drugs for which it receives royalties include Kyprolis, Promacta, Melphalan and Baxdela.

As of 2015, Ligand Pharmaceuticals was partnered with approximately 120 pharmaceutical companies, which include Captisol and its partnerships. Captisol, a Ligand indication, is a chemically modified clathrate compound of the cyclodextrin class designed to improve solubility, stability, bioavailability and dosing of active pharmaceutical ingredients.

History
Ligand Pharmaceuticals was founded, as Progenix Inc., in 1987 by Brook Byers and went public in late 1992. Its first CEO was Howard Birndorf, succeeded by David Robinson, both of whom focused on developing drugs based on orphan nuclear receptors.

In September 2005, the company was delisted by the NASDAQ following "accounting irregularities," that resulted in late filings. The same month the Securities and Exchange Commission of the company's financial reporting, which was characterized as "questionable," and resulted in a "lengthy scandal" according to The San Diego Union-Tribune. In October 2005, the company as well as the Board of Directors and certain officers were named as defendants in a shareholder derivative lawsuit alleging breach of fiduciary duty and that Ligand artificially inflated it's revenue by engaging in “channel stuffing.”  In June 2006, Ligand agreed to pay $12.2 million to settle a securities class-action lawsuit as well as related state and federal shareholder derivative lawsuits that alleged the company had engaged in accounting improprieties.

In addition to accounting irregularities, by 2006 the company had reported no profits despite some of the drugs the company developed being approved, and dissident shareholders, including Dan Loeb, forced Robinson out. He was replaced as CEO by Henry F. Blissenbach who sold all the company's commercial operations and cut the workforce. In January 2007 John Higgins, a former investment banker, was brought in as CEO. He changed the company's strategy to one of acquiring candidate drugs and forming partnerships to develop them further.

In the late 2000s, the company used its capital to acquire other companies including Neurogen, Pharmacopeia biotechnology, Metabasis Therapeutics and Cydex Pharmaceuticals. CEO Higgins stated that the result of the purchases was a portfolio of some 60 new drug candidates, partnerships with pharmaceutical companies and other assets.

In November 2016, The Shareholder Foundation filed a class action lawsuit against Ligand, alleging the company had engaged in securities fraud by making false and misleading statements, overstating the value of its assets, mis-classifying its debt, and by failing to maintain control over its accounting. A separate class-action lawsuit, filed the same month, which named Ligand CEO John Higgins and CFO Matthew Korenberg, alleged, the company's "wrongful acts and omissions" led to a "precipitous" decline the market value of the company's stock and that the company's investors had suffered "significant losses and damages."

In December 2016, Ligand was named as a defendant in multiple securities class action lawsuits, alleging the company had engaged in securities fraud by making false or misleading statements about its financial condition and its ability to control its reporting.

In July 2018, Ligand was sued by investors, including Citadel, for $3.8 billion, alleging the company unfairly modified it's agreements with investors and never filed the amendment with the U.S. Securities and Exchange Commission.

In 2018, Van Doorn ranked Ligand #2 on a list of the fastest-growing companies in the health-care sector. The methodology looked at sales per share and gross margins.

Ligand shares grew 99% from 2014–2019.

Short Seller 
In June 2014, Emmanuel Lemelson, while shorting Ligand stock, published 56 pages of reports that criticized the company as a fraud and alleged the company was insolvent.  The commentary caused a $500 million drop in the company's market capitalization and a profit of $1.4 million to Lemelson. Ligand executives, former high ranking-SEC lawyer Brad Bondi and congressmen Duncan Hunter subsequently lobbied the U.S. Securities and Exchange Commission to charge Lemelson.  According to company emails and trial testimony, Ligand CEO John Higgins wanted Lemelson "silenced for good." In September 2018, the SEC sued Lemelson for an alleged "manipulative scheme" to defraud investors. On November 5, 2021, a federal jury rejected the allegations in a mixed verdict, which cleared Lemelson of the commentary on Ligand in his reports but did find misstatements, including about a different company, Viking Therapeutics.  Lemelson was subsequently fined $160,000.

References

Companies listed on the Nasdaq
Biotechnology companies of the United States
Pharmaceutical companies of the United States
Biopharmaceutical companies
Biotechnology companies established in 1987
Pharmaceutical companies established in 1987
1987 establishments in California
Health care companies based in California
Companies based in San Diego
Biopharmaceuticals
1987 establishments in the United States
Companies established in 1987
1992 initial public offerings